Chris Woods is an American football coach. He is the linebackers coach for Temple Owls football program. Prior to that was the defensive coordinator for the Dallas Renegades of the newly-formed XFL. Wood served as the head football coach at Mansfield University of Pennsylvania from 2001 to 2003 and Stonehill College from 2004 to 2006. He was the interim head football coach at Texas State University for the final game of the 2018 season.

References

External links
 Temple profile

Year of birth missing (living people)
Living people
Bryant Bulldogs football coaches
Columbia Lions football coaches
Dallas Renegades coaches
Davidson Wildcats football players
Harvard Crimson football coaches
Kansas Jayhawks football coaches
Mansfield Mounties football coaches
Oklahoma Sooners football coaches
Plymouth State Panthers football coaches
Stonehill Skyhawks football coaches
Temple Owls football coaches
Texas State Bobcats football coaches
Wittenberg Tigers football coaches
Junior college football coaches in the United States
People from Milton, Massachusetts
Coaches of American football from Massachusetts
Players of American football from Massachusetts